Ginni is a given name, often a short version of Virginia; it may refer to the following notable people: 
Ginni Clemmens (1936-2003), American folk musician and songwriter in the genres of women's music and children's music
Ginni Mahi (born 1998), Indian Punjabi folk, rap and hip-hop singer 
Ginni Mansberg (born 1968), general practitioner and television presenter in Australia
Ginni Rometty (born 1957), business executive
Ginni Thomas (born 1957), American attorney and conservative activist, wife of SCOTUS Justice Clarence Thomas

See also
Ginnie
Jinn